Matthias (24 February 1557 – 20 March 1619) was Holy Roman Emperor from 1612 to 1619, Archduke of Austria from 1608 to 1619, King of Hungary and Croatia from 1608 to 1618, and King of Bohemia from 1611 to 1617. His personal motto was Concordia lumine maior ("Unity is stronger in the light").

Matthias played a significant role in the familial opposition of the Habsburgs against his brother Emperor Rudolf II. After gaining power, he showed little political initiative of his own. The course of his politics was determined by Cardinal Klesl until his fall in 1618. As a consequence of his failed religious and administrative policies the Bohemian Revolt, the initial theatre of the Thirty Years War set off during the final year of his reign.

Biography

Family
Matthias was born in the Austrian capital of Vienna as the fourth son of Maximilian II, Holy Roman Emperor, and Maria of Spain. His brothers were Rudolf (who became Emperor Rudolf II), Ernest, Maximilian (from 1585 Grand Master of the Teutonic Order), Albert (archbishop of Toledo, later governor of the Netherlands), and Wenceslaus (Grand Prior of the Order of Malta in Castile). He also had six sisters. His sister Anna was married to King Philip II of Spain, and his sister Elisabeth to King Charles IX of France. Almost nothing is known about his upbringing. One of his teachers was the writer and historian Ogier Ghislain de Busbecq. Upon Maximilian II's death the family's estates and property were all inherited by Rudolf, the eldest son. The other sons - including Matthias - were compensated with cash pensions and appointments to church or state positions. Matthias married Archduchess Anna of Austria, daughter of his uncle Archduke Ferdinand II of Austria, whose successor in Further Austria Matthias became in 1595. Their marriage did not produce surviving children.

Governor in the Netherlands

In 1578, Matthias was invited to the Netherlands by the States-General of the rebellious provinces, who offered him the position of Governor-General. Matthias had come into contact with Gautier von der Gracht, the envoy of the Dutch provinces, at the Regensburg Reichstag in 1576. Philippe III de Croÿ, Duke of Aarschot and other representatives of a rather moderate party agreed with Matthias to make him the governor of the Netherlands against the will of his uncle, Philip II of Spain, the hereditary ruler of the provinces and without the knowledge of Emperor Rudolf II. Matthias accepted the appointment, although the position was not recognized by Philip II. He set down the rules for religious peace within most of the United Provinces. His work is noted in Article 13 of the 1579 Union of Utrecht, which established freedom of religion as a locally determined issue. Matthias continued as titular governor for the rebels until they deposed Philip II and declared full independence in 1581, at which point he returned home to Austria.

Governor of Austria
He returned to Austria in 1583, where he settled in Linz with a small household. He made several unsuccessful attempts to get elected as bishop (Münster, Liège, Speyer). In 1586 negotiations for the succession of the Polish king Stephen Báthory were equally unsuccessful. He also applied for the regency in Tyrol and Further Austria. It was only when his brother Ernest was appointed General Governor in the Netherlands in 1593 (ruled from 1594) that Matthias was able to secure governance over Austria.

He was immediately confronted with the vigorous advocacy of their religious rights among the Protestant estates. The problems were exacerbated by the high taxes and the troops raised as a result of the Long Turkish War. In the years 1595 and 1597 the farmers in Lower and Upper Austria revolted in the hope to negotiate with the emperor. Matthias forced the insurgents into submission with mercenary troops.

After the uprising had been quelled, Matthias' policies on religion changed. If there had previously been Protestants at his court, he now went on a strict Counter-Reformation course. His chancellor had been Melchior Khlesl, bishop and administrator of Wiener Neustadt, since 1599 and supporter of the Counter-Reformation. The emperor appointed him in 1594/95 and again in 1598/1600 as nominal commander in chief in the Turkish war and as his representative to the Hungarian Reichstag.

Power struggle among the Habsburg brothers

With great concern, the Habsburgs observed the increasing psychological decline of the ageing emperor. After Ernest's death in 1595, Matthias became the oldest among the archdukes. From 1599 onwards Matthias in vain urged the childless emperor to arrange his succession as Matthias was rejected. The crisis carried on in 1604 during the uprising under Stephen Bocskai in Hungary. Matthias initially avoided an argument with the emperor. But Bishop Klesl urged him to take command in the conflict with Rudolf. In November 1600 at Schottwien the Archdukes Matthias, Maximilian and Ferdinand signed an agreement of concerted opposition against the emperor, in 1606 declared Rudolf insane (document dated 25 April), appointed Matthias as the head of the family, and began to oust Rudolf.

As unrest resurfaced in Hungary and spread into parts of Moravia and Austria, Matthias attempted to utilize this opposition in the power struggle against the emperor. He joined the rebellious Diet of Hungary and the Lower and Upper Austrian estates in Bratislava in 1608 and in Moravia shortly later. In April 1608 Matthias marched on Prague and besieged the city. Although unable to fully win over the Bohemian estates, he forced Rudolf to negotiate and sign a peace treaty in June 1608. This, unsurprisingly, resulted in the redistribution of power. Rudolf kept Bohemia, Silesia and Lusatia and Matthias received Hungary, Austria and Moravia.

However, the takeover of power did not proceed according to customary protocol. Matthias, as the new sovereign had not guaranteed the privileges of the estates before they officially paid homage to him. He tried to reverse the order, which led to the so-called Homage dispute. As the majority of the estates were Protestant in Austria and Moravia their nobles then formed the powerful Horner Confederation (Horner Bund) and paid homage only against a guarantee of their religious rights. The Horner Confederation continued to exist until the beginning of the Thirty Years War.

Sovereign rule
 

Matthias was crowned King of Bohemia on 23 May 1611 and was, after Rudolf's death on 20 January 1612, elected Emperor. On 4 December 1611, he married his cousin Archduchess Anna of Austria, yet the union failed to produce children. Matthias allegedly fathered an illegitimate son named Matthias of Austria with an unknown mother.

The court and administration were gradually moved from Prague to Vienna after 1612. The new emperor was less interested in art than Rudolf II and most court artists soon turned their backs on his court. Matthias maintained however a close relationship with the painter Lucas van Valckenborch. For the private crown of his brother Rudolf II, he had a sceptre and an orb made. The Emperor's wife founded the Capuchin Church and the Imperial Crypt in Vienna as the future burial site of the Habsburg family. Matthias had allegedly found a spring in the area of today's Schönbrunn Palace. It is said that it became the eponymous name of the area and the palace from his remark: "Look, what a beautiful spring" (beautiful=schön, spring=Brunn[en]).

After Matthias's imperial accession, his kingship was dominated by Klesl, who hoped to bring about a compromise between Catholic and Protestant states within the Holy Roman Empire in order to strengthen it. Matthias had already been forced to grant religious concessions to Protestants in Austria and Moravia, as well as in Hungary, when he had allied with them against Rudolf. Matthias imprisoned Georg Keglević who was the Commander-in-chief, General, Vice-Ban of Croatia, Slavonia and Dalmatia and since 1602 Baron in Transylvania, but soon left him free again. At that time the Principality of Transylvania was a fully autonomous area of Hungary, but under the nominal suzerainty of the Ottoman Empire, where it was the time of the Sultanate of Women.

Matthias's conciliatory policies were opposed by the more intransigent Catholic Habsburgs, particularly Matthias's brother Archduke Maximilian, who hoped to secure the succession for the inflexible Catholic Archduke Ferdinand (later Emperor Ferdinand II). The Protestant Bohemians, concerned about their religious freedom, fiercely opposed all Catholic officials, appointed by Matthias and the Habsburg Archduke (elected King of Bohemia in June 1617) in particular. The dispute came to a head in the Bohemian Protestant revolt. This provoked Maximilian to imprison Klesl and revise his policies. However, old and ailing, he was unable to prevent a takeover by Maximilian's faction. He died of natural causes at age 62 on 20 March 1619, and Ferdinand, who had already been crowned King of Bohemia (1617) and of Hungary (1618), succeeded Matthias as Holy Roman Emperor.

Burial
As the Imperial Crypt at Vienna was not yet completed, Anna († in 1618) and Matthias († in 1619) were temporarily buried in St. Maria's Queen's Monastery. Not until 1633 were they transferred to the Imperial Crypt at the Capuchin Church. Emperor Matthias is one of the 41 people who received a "separate burial", as their bodies are distributed among all three traditional Viennese burial sites of the Habsburgs (Imperial Crypt, Herzgruft, Ducal Crypt).

Names 

Names in other languages:

Ancestry

Titles
Matthias, by the grace of God elected Holy Roman Emperor, forever August, King in Germany, of Hungary, Bohemia, Dalmatia, Croatia, Slavonia, Rama, Serbia, Galicia, Lodomeria, Cumania and Bulgaria, Archduke of Austria, Duke of Burgundy, Brabant, Styria, Carinthia, Carniola, Luxemburg, Württemberg, the Upper and Lower Silesia, Prince of Swabia, Margrave of the Holy Roman Empire, Burgau, Moravia, the Upper and Lower Lusatia, Princely Count of Habsburg, Tyrol, Ferrette, Kyburg, Gorizia, Landgrave of Alsace, Lord of the Wendish March, Pordenone and Salins, etc. etc.

See also
Kings of Germany family tree. He was related to every other king of Germany.
 Matthias Gate

References

External links

Regnal titles

Mathias, Holy Roman Emperor
Mathias, Holy Roman Emperor
17th-century Holy Roman Emperors
16th-century archdukes of Austria
17th-century archdukes of Austria
Knights of the Golden Fleece
Nobility from Vienna
Austrian people of the Thirty Years' War
Dukes of Carniola
Burials at the Imperial Crypt
Burials at St. Stephen's Cathedral, Vienna
Sons of emperors
 
Children of Maximilian II, Holy Roman Emperor